The Guilford Quarry Pratt Through Truss Bridge at Guilford, Maryland is a single-span, metal truss, railroad bridge

History
The bridge was constructed in 1902 to extend a spur of the B&O railroad beyond Savage, Maryland upstream toward a quarry at Guilford Maryland. The town of Guilford at its peak comprised a mill, quarry, and a small village of stone structures.

Guilford was noted for high quality Granite for building structures. The "old Gault" Guilford quarries first started mining Guilford Quartz Monzonite in 1834. They were managed by the Guilford and Waltersville Granite Company in 1887 and later in 1889 by Matthew Gault & Son prior to the bridge installation on the Little Pautuxent river.  The river was unnavigable by boat cargo, but the location along the east coast fall-line provided watermill power for mill operations and expansion of industrial applications. These included the 1744 Guilford mill expanded to 50 looms by 1881 as the (Gary Cotton Mill) under the proprietorship of James S. Gary until it burned in 1890. In 1901, the Maryland Granite Company was incorporated, purchasing 200 acres of land including the Gault quarry, Lohman and Earp Farms, and Gary Mill property. A standard-gauge railroad extension from the Savage Mill spur of the B&O railroad was started on an escarpment along the river. In addition to the bridge, a steam plant, electric plant, telephone & telegraph lines, air compressor for steel-shot cutting, 20-ton overhead crane and additional houses for employees were planned under the supervision of James J. Miller. The anticipation was to have 200 stonecutters in operation filling three railcars of rough stone daily enabled by the bridge.

The majority of the towns historic structures have since been demolished or displaced by development of the Columbia, Maryland project village of Kings Contrivance, leaving only the bridge and quarry remnants for preservation.
On June 2, 2021, the Guilford Quarry Pratt Through Truss Bridge was registered on the National Register of Historic Places.

Description
The Guilford Quarry Pratt Through Truss Bridge crosses the Little Patuxent River in Howard County Maryland.

See also

List of bridges documented by the Historic American Engineering Record in Maryland
List of Historic Civil Engineering Landmarks 
List of bridges on the National Register of Historic Places in Maryland
List of Howard County properties in the Maryland Historical Trust
List of National Historic Landmarks in Maryland
National Register of Historic Places listings in Howard County, Maryland

References

External links
National Historic Landmark information

Baltimore and Ohio Railroad bridges
Bridges in Howard County, Maryland
Railroad bridges in Maryland
Truss bridges in the United States
Bridges completed in 1902
Historic Civil Engineering Landmarks
Railroad bridges on the National Register of Historic Places in Maryland
Railroad-related National Historic Landmarks
National Historic Landmarks in Maryland
Historic American Engineering Record in Maryland
National Register of Historic Places in Howard County, Maryland
Suspension bridges in Maryland